Andrew Ellison (1812ca. 1860) was an American lawyer and politician who served as a U.S. Representative from Ohio for one term from 1853 to 1855.

Biography 
Born in West Union, Ohio, Ellison attended the public schools.  He studied law, was admitted to the bar in Adams County, Ohio, in August 1835 and commenced practice in Georgetown, Ohio, the same year.

Ellison was elected prosecuting attorney of Brown County and served from 1840 to 1843.  He served as member of the Ohio House of Representatives in 1846.

Ellison was elected as a Democrat to the Thirty-third Congress (March 4, 1853 – March 3, 1855).  He was an unsuccessful candidate for reelection in 1854 to the Thirty-fourth Congress.  He resumed the practice of law.  He died about 1860.

Sources

1812 births
1860s deaths
People from West Union, Ohio
People from Georgetown, Ohio
Democratic Party members of the Ohio House of Representatives
County district attorneys in Ohio
Democratic Party members of the United States House of Representatives from Ohio
19th-century American politicians